This is a list of causal mapping software.

Causal mapping software enables users to create and/or work with causal maps: qualitative networks of interconnected nodes in which each connection represents a causal link.

Software and services for concept mapping can also be used for causal mapping if they allow the creation of directed links. They are only included here if they include any additional features specifically useful for causal mapping, such as:
Calculation / simulation of downstream causal effects
Ability to distinguish between different sources of evidence for individual links
Ability to create causal links on the basis of highlighted passages of source text

Causal mapping software

References